Theatre-By-the-Sea (also known as Theater by the Sea) is a historic theater and playhouse at Cards Pond Road in South Kingstown, Rhode Island.  It was added to the National Register of Historic Places in 1980.

History

Theatre By The Sea (TBTS) has had many incarnations over the years. Between 1928 and 1933, Mrs. Alice Jaynes Tyler ran a camp for girls on the property of her summer home. With the Great Depression quickly limiting the market for summer camps, she decided to instead create jobs by turning the old shingled barn into a theatre. She teamed up with Russian defector and actor Leo Bulgakoff, the cockney producer, Leslie Spiller and famed lighting designer Abe Feder – and on August 7, 1933, Mrs. Jaynes’ 300-seat barn theatre came to life. The theater was founded in 1933.

The next thirty five years brought numerous changes. On September 21, 1938, the New England Hurricane of 1938 caused extensive damage which led to the first major alterations. After carefully cutting the theatre in half with a hand saw, the box office was literally pulled forward by a dump truck, and a new section of theatre and a balcony were added. By 1941, with the war raging, the theatre went mainly dark. During this time, it did however became a target spot for military planes to practice their diving maneuvers during the war and sporadically played as a movie house. By 1947, during the Golden Era of Summer Stock, TBTS was again in full swing and entered into a long and fruitful stretch that lasted for almost 10 years. Famous "golden era" stars that played TBTS include Marlon Brando, Carol Channing, Groucho Marx, Tallulah Bankhead, Mae West, Judy Holiday, Shelley Winters, and many others. The passing of Mrs. Tyler in 1951, Hurricane Carol in 1954 and a “dark” summer in 1959, threatened the theatre's life when it shut again in 1963.

In 1967, upon hearing that the theatre was to be destroyed, Tommy Brent, former Press Agent and Producer saved the theater from demolition by mere hours. Mr. Brent was able to run the theatre for 22 years. However, the property itself was in serious need of repair and renovation. The multi-faceted entertainment company, FourQuest took over the theatre in 1988 and became the third owners of the property. Following extensive renovations that fall and winter, FourQuest re-opened the theater in the spring of 1989 and continued until the fall of 2003. The theatre closed again until a Massachusetts businessman and movie theatre owner, Mr. William Hanney, purchased the property, hoping to continue the tradition of theatre at this historic Rhode Island landmark. From 2007-2012 shows at Theatre by the Sea were produced by the not-for-profit organization Ocean State Theatre Company.  In 2013 Mr. Hanney and Production company Matunuck Live Theatre assumed production responsibilities.

See also
National Register of Historic Places listings in Washington County, Rhode Island

References

External links

Official web site

Theatres completed in 1933
Theatres in Rhode Island
Theatres on the National Register of Historic Places in Rhode Island
Buildings and structures in South Kingstown, Rhode Island
Tourist attractions in Washington County, Rhode Island
National Register of Historic Places in Washington County, Rhode Island
Barn theatres